Sky Ark Inc. is a non-governmental, non-profit organization that provides free air and ground transportation and airlift services to rescue groups and government agencies during natural disaster. They use volunteer pilots to fly rescue, special needs, or animals with medical issues, for free.

Sky Ark was a nonprofit organization providing free transport services for animals to rescue groups, zoos and sanctuaries needing to transport animals over long distances in the United States. They also transported the animal and humanitarian community during disasters and desperate crises.

Sky Ark was founded in April 2003 by Mickey and Cara Russell, using their own financial resources and later transitioned to being funded through various sources, including private foundations and corporate donations.

On June 28, 2016, Mickey Russell shot and killed his estranged wife, Cara Russell, and then shot and killed himself.

In 2018, their federal tax-exempt status was automatically revoked for not filing a Form 990-series return or notice for three consecutive years. As of 2023, their exempt status has not been renewed.

See also 
 Animal Rescue
 Animal welfare

References

External links
Official Ark website archives, on Archive.org

Organizations established in 2003
Animal charities based in the United States
Charities based in Colorado
Airlifts